Harry Watson "Maud" Crum (July 10, 1899 – February 14, 1968) was an American football player and coach of football and basketball.  He served as the head football coach at George Washington University from 
1924 to 1928 and at Allegheny College from 1929 to 1931, compiling a career college football record of 40–25–7.  Crum was also the head basketball coach at George Washington from 1927 to 1929, tally a mark of 13–14.

Coaching career
Crum accepted the position of head football coach at the George Washington University in 1924. He was the first to remain in that position with the "Hatchetites" for more than four years. He then coached the football team at Allegheny College in Meadville, Pennsylvania. He held that position for three seasons, from 1929 until 1931. His coaching record at Allegheny was 14–7–4.

Later life and death
Crum died in 1968 at a hospital in New Kensington, Pennsylvania. In his later years he had worked as an attorney.

Head coaching record

Football

References

External links
 

1899 births
1968 deaths
20th-century American lawyers
American football halfbacks
Allegheny Gators football coaches
George Washington Colonials football coaches
George Washington Colonials men's basketball coaches
Princeton Tigers football players
High school football coaches in Pennsylvania
Pennsylvania lawyers
People from Westmoreland County, Pennsylvania
Coaches of American football from Pennsylvania
Players of American football from Pennsylvania